Ölgii is the capital of the Bayan-Ölgii Aimag (province) of Mongolia, located in the extreme west of the country. As of 2014 it had a population of 30,338 people.

Culture
The center of the predominantly Kazakh region of Mongolia, Kazakh is the primary language spoken in Ölgii. The city is home to at least 4 mosques. The city is known for its Kazakh embroidery and art, Kazakh music, and hunting with eagles. Each October, Ölgii hosts the annual Golden Eagle Festival which showcases the ancient Kazakh custom of eagle hunting.

History
Ölgii was an ethnic Kazakh village before the founding of the modern nation of Mongolia in 1911. Kazakhs have been coming to the Altai region of Mongolia for at least 200 years. Many came as Kazakhs faced pressure from the expanding Russian Empire. These numbers increased significantly after the 1917 Russian Revolution and the rise of communism in China. It was the center of Islam in Mongolia before religious purges in the 1930s in which the mosque was destroyed and the imam was executed. Mongolia initially tried to suppress Kazakh language and culture before creating Bayan-Ölgii Aimag in 1939, with Ölgii as the seat of government.

Much of the center of the city was built in the 1950s to 1980s. Ölgii developed less than the rest of Mongolia and was not connected by railroad or paved road due to its isolated location and lack of mineral resources. After the Mongolian democratic revolution in 1991 and the breakup of the Soviet Union, 25% of the population moved to newly independent Kazakhstan. Though, many later returned and the population has largely recovered. In recent years construction has increased significantly resulting in many new apartments, shops, restaurants, and hotels (most have been built since 2005), mirroring a construction boom throughout Mongolia.

Like other post-communist cities, much of the industry closed down in the 1990s, although a large wool factory and many smaller animal related factories continue to process products from the 2 million animals in the aimag.

Transportation

The Ölgii Airport (ULG/ZMUL) has one paved runway. It offers regular flights to Ulan Bator and Khovd and irregular flights to Ulaangom in Mongolia and Almaty in Kazakhstan via Oskemen Airport.

Bayan-Ölgii has border crossings with Russia and China. The Tsaagannuur Border crossing with Russia is open year-round and is the preferred route for traveling to and from Kazakhstan. This crossing does not have immigration offices. People will need to acquire a visa before going to the border. The Taikeshken border crossing with China is only open during the summer due to high mountain passes that become difficult to pass during winter months.

There are few paved roads in Bayan-Ölgii outside of Ölgii. Half the distance between Tsaagannuur village (30 km from the border crossing) and Ölgii is paved. The government of Mongolia plans to pave the Tsaagannuur to Ulaanbaatar route through Ölgii, Khovd, Govi-Altai, and Övörkhangai Provinces by 2015.

Regularly scheduled buses connect Ölgii to Ulaanbaatar, with trips leaving 3 days a week. The non-stop trip is 48 hours under ideal conditions, though often lasting 3 to 5 days. Stops are made along the ways for meals and restroom breaks.

Structures
There is a 352.5 metre tall guyed radio mast for broadcasting on 207 kHz radio waves.

Climate
Ölgii experiences a subarctic-influenced desert climate (Köppen BWk) with long, very dry, very cold winters and short, warm summers.

Notable people
Darmen Hussein (Хузкейн Дармен) (born 1964), engineer and Democratic Party politician. A graduate of Zaisanov Secondary School and the Polytechnic Institute in Ulaanbaatar in electrical engineering in 1987, he began his career as an engineer working at Erdenet Thermal Power Station, before being elected governor of the province (airmag) three times.

References

External links

Official Tourism Website

Populated places in Mongolia
Aimag centers
Districts of Bayan-Ölgii Province